Henry Robert Merrill Levan (May 17, 1921 – February 17, 1998) was an American songwriter, theatrical composer, lyricist, and screenwriter. He was one of the most successful songwriters of the 1950s on the US and  UK single charts. He wrote musicals for the Broadway stage, including Carnival! (music and lyrics) and Funny Girl (lyrics).

Life and career
Merrill played an important role in American popular music; though not able to play a musical instrument, he tapped out many of the hit parade songs of the 1950s on a toy xylophone, including "(How Much Is) That Doggie in the Window?", "Mambo Italiano" and "If I Knew You Were Comin' I'd've Baked a Cake" as well as writing music and lyrics for several Broadway shows including Funny Girl.

Merrill was born in Atlantic City, New Jersey and raised in Philadelphia over his family's candy factory and soda fountain. As a teenager, he wanted to be a singer and performed in all local talent contests, and even worked as an impressionist-emcee at a local burlesque house.  His plans for a career in show business were cut short by the advent of World War II when he was drafted into the Horse Cavalry Division of the Army. After the war, Merrill moved to Hollywood, where he worked as a dialogue director for Columbia Pictures and while on location for a film, he was asked to write some songs for the actress in the film, Dorothy Shay, who was recording an album at the time.  Shay's album Park Avenue Hillbilly became a hit which launched his career. Soon he was invited to collaborate with Al Hoffman and Clem Watts to write some songs.  They came up with a novelty song "If I Knew You Were Comin' I'd've Baked a Cake", recorded in 1948 by Eileen Barton. He also co-wrote the Moon Mullican song "You Don't Have to Be a Baby to Cry".

The other Top Ten songs for which he is best known include

"People" – Barbra Streisand
"(How Much Is) That Doggie in the Window?" – Patti Page 
"If I Knew You Were Comin' I'd've Baked a Cake" – Eileen Barton
"Honeycomb" – Jimmie Rodgers 
"Mambo Italiano" – Rosemary Clooney
"Pittsburgh, Pennsylvania" – Guy Mitchell
"Love Makes the World Go 'Round" – Jane Morgan
"The Kid's Last Fight" – Frankie Laine 
"Tina Marie" – Perry Como 
"Make Yourself Comfortable" – Sarah Vaughan

Guy Mitchell recorded many of Merrill's songs including "Sparrow in the Treetop", "She Wears Red Feathers", and "My Truly, Truly Fair".

Merrill made his Broadway debut in 1957 with New Girl in Town, a musical adaptation of Eugene O'Neill's Anna Christie. The musical was nominated for the Tony Award for Best Musical. Take Me Along followed in 1959, with music and lyrics by Merrill, starring Jackie Gleason and Walter Pidgeon. The musical was nominated for the 1960 Tony Award for Best Musical. In 1961, the film Lili was made into the Broadway musical Carnival!, starring Anna Maria Alberghetti with words and music by Merrill. The musical was nominated for the 1962 Tony Award for Best Musical.

He had theatrical success with the Barbra Streisand musical Funny Girl, (1964) which introduced the standards "People" and "Don't Rain on My Parade". Merrill and Jule Styne were nominated for the 1964 Tony Award for Best Composer and Lyricist. When the stage show was adapted for film, he and songwriting partner Jule Styne were asked to write a title tune, which was nominated for the 1968 Academy Award and Golden Globe for Best Song. 

Producer David Merrick hired Merrill to write additional songs for the musical Hello, Dolly!. Merrill contributed two songs, "Motherhood March" and "Elegance", and some additional lyrics to Jerry Herman's "It Takes a Woman". Merrill did not accept billing or credit for his additions to the score. He is also the lyricist of the theme song "Loss Of Love", from the 1970 Italian drama film Sunflower and composed by Henry Mancini.

Merrill's other Broadway credits include Breakfast at Tiffany's (1966), Henry, Sweet Henry (1967), Sugar (1972) (reworked as Some Like It Hot for a 1992 production in London's West End starring Tommy Steele and a 2002-2003 United States national tour starring Tony Curtis as Osgood Fielding, Jr.), and The Red Shoes (1993).

He wrote the book and lyrics for the musical Prettybelle (1971), which closed in Boston during tryouts. Angela Lansbury starred, with direction by Gower Champion. He wrote the music and lyrics for the musical The Prince of Grand Street (1978), which closed during its Boston tryouts. The musical starred Robert Preston and was directed by Gene Saks. Because of reviews during the Philadelphia tryout, an entire new first act was written for Boston.

He was nominated for the Tony Award five times, but never won. However, in 1961 he won the New York Drama Critics Award for his work on Carnival!. Merrill's screenwriting credits include W. C. Fields and Me (1976), and the television movies Portrait of a Showgirl (1982) and The Animated Adventures of Tom Sawyer (1998). Among Merrill's television credits were two holiday specials, Mister Magoo's Christmas Carol (1962)
 and The Dangerous Christmas of Red Riding Hood (1965), written for Liza Minnelli.

Personal life and death
Merrill was married to Dolores Marquez in 1964; they divorced and he married Suzanne Reynolds in 1976. Merrill became ill with various ailments in the mid-1990s; suffering from depression, he killed himself on February 17, 1998.

Stage musicals

 New Girl In Town (1957)
 Take Me Along (1959)
 Carnival! (1961)
 Funny Girl (1964)
 Breakfast at Tiffany's (1966)
 Henry, Sweet Henry (1967)
 Prettybelle (1971)
 Sugar (1972)
 The Prince of Grand Street (1978)
 We're Home (1984) – Off-Broadway
 Hannah... 1939 (1990) – Off-Broadway
 The Red Shoes (1993) (credited as Paul Stryker)
Source: Playbill

Merrill compositions recorded by Guy Mitchell
Source: AllMusic

"Chicka Boom"
"Feet Up (Pat Him on the Po-Po)"
"Look at That Girl"
"My Truly, Truly Fair"
"Pittsburgh, Pennsylvania"
"She Wears Red Feathers"
"Sparrow in the Treetop"

References

External links

Internet Broadway Database
Bob Merrill at the Songwriters Hall of Fame

1921 births
1998 deaths
Musicians from Atlantic City, New Jersey
Songwriters from New Jersey
American male composers
American musical theatre composers
American musical theatre lyricists
Broadway composers and lyricists
Grammy Award winners
20th-century American composers
20th-century American male musicians
American male songwriters